Harry Lewis (Harry Besterman; September 16, 1886 – February 22, 1956), was an American boxer, generally credited with holding the Welterweight Championship of the World from April 1908 to March 1911.  He defeated "Young Joseph", the reigning Welterweight Champion of England in London on June 27, 1910, but was not credited with the British Welterweight championship as the fight was sanctioned as a World, and not English title. Boxing writer Nat Fleischer rated Lewis the sixth-greatest welterweight of all time. He was inducted into the International Jewish Sports Hall of Fame in 2002, and into the International Boxing Hall of Fame in 2008.

Early life and boxing as a feather and lightweight
Lewis was born Harry Besterman in New York City on September 6, 1886, and was Jewish.  While he was a young child his family moved to Philadelphia.  Besterman took his ring name "Lewis" from a local fight manager.  In Lewis's early fighting career, his father Jake often gave advice to Harry at ringside during fights. According to Ken Blady, Lewis's father turned out to be a "thorn in the flesh of Harry's professional managers." With a strong jaw, and an impressive defensive style, Lewis was knocked out only twice in his career.

Lewis's future rival, Willie Lewis once told Ring Magazine that Harry "specialized in knocking out guys who were never knocked out before. Harry was an artist in feinting and countering. His punches only went a few inches, but boy what authority they carried."  He was also known for a powerful left hook to the midsection that characterized his early and mid-career.

In 1903, at the age of seventeen, Lewis turned professional. His father Jake Besterman helped manage many of his early fights and was an ardent supporter. According to author Ken Blady, he lost only three times in his first fifty professional bouts.  Proving his status as a contender, Lewis fought accomplished boxer Tommy Lowe on January 2, 1905, in a fifteen round draw in Philadelphia.  He had an important 15-round bout with featherweight Kid Herman on April 28, 1905, in Baltimore which ended in a draw.

Classic bout with Benny Yanger
On May 19, 1905, in only his second year of boxing, he met Benny Yanger, an exceptional featherweight, whom he defeated in a first round TKO at the armory in Baltimore. Three doctors at ringside reported Yanger had broken his arm during the bout.  Partly accounting for his legendary reputation, three years earlier in 1902, Yanger had been one of the few boxers to ever defeat Abe Attell during his early reign as featherweight champion.

Lewis's move to lightweight and bout with champion Joe Gans
Moving up from featherweight in 1905, Lewis fought leading lightweight contender Young Erne six times, losing only twice, though drawing the remainder of his fights. He fought Unk Russell twice in October and November 1905, winning decisively in two six round bouts in Philadelphia, and further demonstrating his potential as a serious contender.

On June 15, 1906, Lewis took on the great reigning black Lightweight World Champion Joe Gans in Philadelphia at the National Athletic Club. Both boxers connected with serious blows in different rounds, though Gans was able to knock Lewis to the mat in two rounds. Though the fight was a six round no decision, Lewis was viewed as a far more dangerous competitor having compared favorably with one of history's greatest lightweights. Newspapers split on which boxer had the edge in the fight, but the Philadelphia Item, who had reporters on the scene, called the fight a draw. The Police Gazette considered the bout the best of Lewis's career. On January 25 of that year, he fought Willie Lewis for three rounds in New York, losing in the newspaper decision of the Boston Globe.  Willie Lewis would become a frequent opponent of Harry by 1908 and help to draw large crowds.

Lewis knocked out Canadian Mike Ward in Grand Rapids, Michigan on November 16, 1906. According to the Rock Island Argus, in the eighth round, Ward was knocked down for the first time and took a count of nine, but got up and continued fighting. Lewis immediately connected with a blow that sent Ward to the canvas for at least five minutes before he could regain consciousness, though he immediately slipped back into a comatose state. Ward died the next day. Lewis claimed that Ward striking the canvas when he fell was largely the cause of his death, and a post-mortem supported his conclusion. Lewis was subsequently charged with manslaughter as a result of Ward's death and was fined $1,000 for engaging in a prize fight.  His father and manager Jacob Besterman was fined the same amount for aiding in a prize fight and his trainer Frank O'Brien was fined as well.

Winning the Welterweight World Title
Having stood the test with the great lightweight Gans, Lewis moved up to welterweight, and defeated Rube Smith convincingly on January 22, 1907, in an eight-round knockout in Denver.

He defeated Mike "Twin" Sullivan in Denver on February 21, 1907, in a very close match just two months before Sullivan would take the World Welterweight title from reigning champion William Mellody in Los Angeles.  Lewis's fight with Sullivan was close and both boxers showed skills.  A reporter for the St. John Sun partial to Sullivan's performance noted that "What punches were landed were put through by Sullivan, who fought Lewis all over the ring in every round." The reporter observed the superior punching power of Sullivan, but also paid homage to Lewis's scientific boxing skills when he observed, "Lewis seemed to change his style of fighting in every round."  Lewis fought the bout at only 140, and was probably outweighed by Sullivan, who was known for his strength and strong punching ability. Though highly unpopular with the crowd, the decision against Sullivan by referee Reddy Gallagher may have been influenced by Lewis's style, speed, and defensive skills.  A year later, when Lewis met world welterweight champion Honey Mellody, he  added both weight and strength to his natural skills of speed and technique.

On May 6, 1907, Lewis fought accomplished light welterweight Jimmy Gardner in a six round bout, further demonstrating his status as a contender. Two weeks later on May 21, Lewis defeated Gardner in a ten round bout in Denver.

When Sullivan relinquished his title for being over the welterweight limit, Lewis decided to lay claim to it.  On January 23, 1908, he defeated the top world championship welterweight claimant Frank Mantell at Edgewood Athletic Club in New Haven, Connecticut in a third round TKO, giving real substance to his claim to the title.  At the zenith of his career, Lewis secured the Welterweight Championship of the World defeating William "Honey" Mellody, the most recent holder of the title, on April 20, 1908, at the armory in Boston in a fourth round TKO, although no single sanctioning organization was recognized worldwide at the time. The Gazette Times wrote of the fight that "Lewis scored a knockdown in the first round and in point of cleverness outclassed Mellody," in the exceptional fourth round knockout. Several other boxers vied to claim the title as it was vacant at the time, but most sources now recognize Lewis's claim.

Lewis fought accomplished Philadelphia welterweight Unk Russell twice in May in Philadelphia and then three times in July, September and October 1908, in classic fast, and aggressive bouts with Lewis winning most handily in the September bout in Boston.  As a five time opponent in 1908, Lewis's bouts with Russell characterized his style in his early reign as the welterweight champion.

On December 14, 1908, Harry had a close bout with one of his frequent opponents, welterweight contender Willie Lewis at the New Haven, Connecticut, Grand Opera House.  As was typical of Lewis's style of boxing, he was an expert in counter punching, rapid blows, and scientific boxing. The New London Day wrote of the fight "Harry put on a very fast exhibition of infighting in the early stages of the go but towards the end he seemed to lose out in putting his punches over with the necessary force and as a result the New York boy (Willie) was in a fair way of stopping his namesake who holds the championship." The New York Times, however, considered the twelve round bout a draw. Among the two preliminary bouts, the first was a close fight between New London native Abe Hollandersky and Maurice Lemoine of Webster, Massachusetts.

Boxing in Europe, and relinquishing the welterweight championship

From early 1910 until the fall of 1913, Lewis fought overseas in France and England. Lewis and his friend Willie Lewis toured France, meeting twice to packed houses in Paris in 25 round draws.  Both bouts with Willie Lewis in March and April 1910 were billed as Welterweight championships of the World.

Defeating the English Welterweight Champion
On June 27, 1910, he fought in London for the English welterweight crown, against Ansel "Young" Joseph, winning in a seventh round TKO at Wonderland in London, and knocking down Joseph nine times in the bout. The purse was set at $3000 by the National Sporting Club of London.  He also defeated English welterweight champion Johnny Summers on January 25, 1911, though Summers was over the welterweight limit, and the fight was not an official title match according to some sources.

During an interlude back in America in the fall of 1910, Lewis lost to Leo Houck twice in non-title fights, once on August 23 and once on September 17, 1910, in Boston and Philadelphia, though the loss in Philadelphia was by the decision of two Philadelphia newspapers.

Boxing as a middleweight
Lewis relinquished the welterweight title in March 1911, being unable to make the welterweight limit. After this date, he fought almost exclusively as a middleweight.

On May 3, 1911, Lewis lost to Leo Houck at L'Hippodrome in Paris while Emile Maitrot acted as referee. BoxRec records this bout as the loss of the Middleweight World Championship which Lewis claimed to have taken on February 22, 1911, from Blink McClosky previously at the Hippodrome.  The Middleweight World Championship had been vacated by Stanley Ketchell the previous year, and remained vacant all of 1911, though no sanctioning bodies active today recognize Lewis's claim to the title.

Boxing decline and retirement

After his loss to Houck, Lewis's boxing fortunes began to decline. On December 13, 1911, he lost to French boxing great Georges Carpentier at the Cirque de Paris in front of large enthusiastic crowds. Lewis was outweighed by Carpentier, and had at least a four-inch disadvantage in height as well. The fight demonstrates Lewis's gameness, but also the peculiar regulation of the sport during the period.  In a show of old greatness, he defeated the Dixie Kid in Liverpool, England in an eighth round TKO on January 18, 1912.

Returning to Philadelphia, Lewis made a tragic mistake agreeing to box Joe Borrell on October 13, 1913, at the Olympia Athletic Club in Philadelphia. He had been in a car accident while traveling in a taxi in Philadelphia the previous spring and had suffered a head injury.  During the Borrell fight, Lewis was knocked to the canvas twice and according to boxing writer Ken Blady, was "so groggy and dazed between rounds that the referee had to stop the fight."  By the fifth round he was unable to resume the bout after being knocked to the canvas. Taken to Philadelphia Hospital, he was subsequently diagnosed with a blood clot in his brain. Lewis suffered from partial paralysis the remainder of his life.

After recovering, he managed a number of boxers in his retirement, including Bernie Manhoff.  Lewis died on February 22, 1956, in Philadelphia at the age of 69.

Titles won
Following are the dates in which Lewis is most frequently cited for holding the World Welterweight title. Several sources state he relinquished the title in March 1911 because he was above the Welterweight limit.  Several boxers claimed the American title after Lewis relinquished it with no universally recognized successor until Ted "Kid" Lewis in 1915.

Some sources state Harry Lewis won the British welterweight title when he defeated Young Joseph in London on June 27, 1910, however according to BoxRec, the British Boxing Board of Control (BBBofC) believed the title Lewis fought for against Young Joseph was the World not the British Welterweight Title, and so Young Joseph retained the British Title when he lost to Lewis.

Lewis claimed he held the World Middleweight Title between February 22, 1911, when he defeated Blink McCloskey at the Hippodrome in Paris, and May 3, 1911, when he lost to middleweight contender Leo Houck at the same location.  The title was vacant at the time due to the death of Stanley Ketchel who had previously held it. No sanctioning bodies today recognize his claim during that period, but it is listed in the table below.

|- 

|- 
|- 

|-

Professional boxing record
All information in this section is derived from BoxRec, unless otherwise stated.

Official record

All newspaper decisions are officially regarded as “no decision” bouts and are not counted in the win/loss/draw column.

Unofficial record

Record with the inclusion of newspaper decisions in the win/loss/draw column.

See also
List of select Jewish boxers
 Blady, Ken, The Jewish Boxers' Hall of Fame, (1988). Shapolsky Publishers, Inc, New York, pgs.  77-80

References

External links
 
International Jewish Sports Hall of Fame Bio
Jews in Sports Bio

1886 births
1956 deaths
Boxers from Philadelphia
Boxers from New York (state)
Jewish American boxers
Jewish boxers
World boxing champions
World welterweight boxing champions
Welterweight boxers
American male boxers